XHMI-FM is a Spanish & English Top 40 (CHR) radio station in Campeche, Campeche, Mexico on 100.3 FM. It is affiliated with MVS Radio's Exa FM.

References

External links
Official website
Exa FM 100.3

1978 establishments in Mexico
Radio stations established in 1978
Mass media in Campeche City
Radio stations in Campeche
Spanish-language radio stations
Contemporary hit radio stations in Mexico